Definitions of White Americans typically excludes White Hispanic and Multiracial Americans people.

15 largest US cities

Cities with the highest percentage of White Americans (includes White Hispanic)

References

White
White Americans